Urvashi Dholakia is an Indian television actress, known as Komolika of Kasautii Zindagii Kay. Dholakia has won many awards for her Komolika (character).

Indian Television Academy Awards

The Indian Television Academy Awards, also known as the (ITA Awards) is an annual event organised by the Indian Television Academy. The awards are presented in various categories, including popular programming (music, news, entertainment, sports, travel, lifestyle and fashion), best television channel in various categories, technical awards, and Best Performance awards.

Indian Telly Awards

The 'Indian Telly Awards' are annual honours presented by the company of Indian Television to persons and organisations in the television industry of India. The Awards are given in several categories such as best programme or series in a specific genre, best television channel in a particular category, most popular actors and awards for technical roles such as writers and directors.

Star International Awards

Apsara Awards

The Apsara Film & Television Producers Guild Awards are presented annually by members of the Apsara Producers Guild to honour Excellence in film and television.

Gold Awards

The Zee Gold Awards (also known as the Gold Television or Boroplus Awards) are honours presented excellence in the television industry. The Awards are given in several categories.

Sinsui Television Awards

Sinsui awards awarded the awards to the following members of Kasauti in 2006.

Kalakar Awards

The Kalakar Awards are given by Bengali Federation of India to honour the Best in Regional as well as Hindi television and cinema.

Golden Glory Awards

References

Urvashi Dholakia